Banco Interatlântico is a Cape Verdean commercial bank. Its headquarter is at Avenida Cidade de Lisboa in Praia. The bank was established in July 1999 as a subsidiary of the Portuguese Caixa Geral de Depósitos. The CGD Group now owns 70% of Banco Interatlântico.

See also
List of companies in Cape Verde

References

External links
Banco Interatlântico's Official website

Banks of Cape Verde
Companies based in Praia
1999 establishments in Cape Verde